The du Pont family or Du Pont family is a prominent American family descended from Pierre Samuel du Pont de Nemours (1739–1817). It has been one of the richest families in the United States since the mid-19th century, when it founded its fortune in the gunpowder business. In the late 19th and early 20th centuries, it expanded its wealth through the chemical industry and the automotive industry, with substantial interests in the DuPont company, General Motors, and various other corporations.

Several former du Pont family estates are open to the public as museums, gardens or parks, such as Winterthur, Nemours, Eleutherian Mills, Longwood Gardens, Gibraltar, Mt. Cuba, and Goodstay. The family's interest in horticulture was planted in the United States by their immigrant progenitors from France and was also nourished and cultivated in later generations by avid gardeners who married into the family. As early as 1924, the du Ponts were recognized by Charles Sprague Sargent, the famed plantsman and director of Harvard's Arnold Arboretum, as "a family which has made the neighborhood of Wilmington, Delaware one of the chief centers of horticulture in the United States."

The family's first American estate, Eleutherian Mills, located at Hagley Museum and Library, was preserved and restored by Louise E. du Pont Crowninshield. She also helped to establish the National Trust for Historic Preservation in 1949. In recent years, the family has continued to be known for its association with political and business ventures, as well as philanthropic causes.

Two family members were the subjects of well-publicized criminal cases. John Eleuthère du Pont was convicted of murdering wrestling coach Dave Schultz in 1996, and Robert H. Richards IV was convicted of raping his 3-year-old daughter in 2009. The family is depicted in the 2014 biographical film Foxcatcher, with Steve Carell playing John Eleuthère du Pont and Vanessa Redgrave playing Jean du Pont, the wife of William du Pont Jr.

As of 2016, the family fortune was estimated at $14.3 billion, spread across more than 3,500 living relatives.

History

Pierre Samuel du Pont de Nemours was the son of a Parisian watchmaker and a member of a Burgundian Huguenot family, and descendant of a minor noble family on his mother's side. He and his sons, Victor Marie du Pont and Éleuthère Irénée du Pont, migrated from France in 1800 to the United States and used the resources of their Huguenot heritage to found one of the most prominent of American families, and one of its most successful corporations, E. I. du Pont de Nemours and Company, initially established by Éleuthère Irénée as a gunpowder manufacturer.

In 1802, Éleuthère Irénée du Pont established a gunpowder mill on the banks of the Brandywine River near Wilmington, Delaware. The location (named Eleutherian Mills) provided all the necessities to operate the mill: a water flow sufficient to power it, available timber (mainly willow trees) that could be turned into charcoal fine enough to use for gunpowder, and close proximity to the Delaware River to allow for shipments of sulfur and saltpeter, the other ingredients used in the manufacture of gunpowder. There were also nearby stone quarries to provide needed building materials.

Over time, the Du Pont company grew into the largest black powder manufacturing firm in the world. The family remained in control of the company up through the 1960s, and family trusts still own a substantial amount of the company's stock. This and other companies run by the du Pont family employed up to 10 percent of Delaware's population at its peak. During the 19th century, the Du Pont family maintained their family wealth by carefully arranged marriages between cousins which, at the time, was the norm for many families.

The family played a large part in politics during the 18th and 19th centuries and assisted in negotiations for the Treaty of Paris and the Louisiana Purchase. Both T. Coleman and Henry A. du Pont served as U.S. senators, and Pierre S. du Pont, IV served as Governor of Delaware.

The family has also played an important role in historic preservation and land conservation, including helping to found the National Trust for Historic Preservation, preserving President James Madison's home Montpelier, and establishing numerous museums such as Winterthur and the Delaware Museum of Natural History. In 2013, Lammot du Pont Copeland's Mt. Cuba Center contributed over $20 million to purchase land for donation to the federal government to form the First State National Historical Park.

Beginning with William du Pont, Jr. and his sister, Marion duPont Scott, many members of the Du Pont family have been involved in the breeding and racing of thoroughbred racehorses, as well as establishing racehorse venues and training tracks, including Delaware Park and Fair Hill, MD. While most Du Ponts are members of the Episcopal Church, Éleuthère Irénée du Pont was a Huguenot.

Spelling of the name
The stylings "du Pont" and "Du Pont" are most prevalent for the family name in published, copy-edited writings. In many publications, the styling is "du Pont" when quoting an individual's full name and "Du Pont" when speaking of the family as a whole, although some individual Du Ponts have chosen to style it differently, such as Samuel Francis Du Pont. The name of the chemical company founded by the family is today styled solid as "DuPont" in the short form (but the long form is styled as E. I. du Pont de Nemours and Company); the stylings "Du Pont" and "DuPont" for the company's short name coexisted in the 20th century, but the latter is now consistently used in the company's branding. The solid styling "duPont" is less common, but the Nemours Alfred I. duPont Hospital for Children uses it, as does the duPont Registry. William S. Dutton's mid-20th-century history of the family business uses "Du Pont" both for the family mentioned generally and for the company's short name but "du Pont" in an individual's full name (for example, "Éleuthère Irénée du Pont", "Henry du Pont", "Alfred Victor du Pont", "Lammot du Pont"); for example, "when he [Lammot du Pont] went to General Henry du Pont with the proposal that the Du Ponts manufacture dynamite, he was answered by a blunt and unqualified 'No!'") The first page of Dutton's monograph contains the following footnote about the surname's styling (the mention of "Samuel Dupont" here refers to the 18th-century Parisian watchmaker, not to his 19th-century descendant): "Samuel Dupont used this form of the family name [i.e., Dupont], but beginning in 1763 his son signed himself 'Du Pont.' Later, he added 'de Nemours' to his name to prevent confusion with two other Duponts in the French Chamber of Deputies. Du Pont, in English, is pronounced with the accent on the second syllable. In French, neither syllable is accented." 

French orthographic tradition for the styling of de (or its inflected forms) as a surname particle, in either nobiliary or non-nobiliary form, is discussed at Nobiliary particle § France. In non-nobiliary form, the prevalent French styling of the name is "Dupont", and thus the choice by Pierre Samuel du Pont de Nemours to begin styling himself so during the monarchical era hints at social ambition. But the influence of French orthography and prerevolutionary class structure on how English orthography styles surnames today is outweighed by how families and individuals so named style themselves.

Alphabetical list of selected descendants of Pierre Samuel du Pont de Nemours

Below is an alphabetical listing of selected members of the family.

Family tree
The following list is not a complete genealogy, but is ordered by descent to show the familial relationships between members of the du Pont family throughout history.

Family network

Associates 

Edward Ball
Thomas F. Bayard Jr.
Joe Biden
Jacques Antoine Bidermann
Lucius M. Boomer
Donaldson Brown
C. Douglass Buck
Wallace Carothers
R. R. M. Carpenter
Walter S. Carpenter Jr.
Theophilus P. Chandler Jr.
Uma Chowdhry
Marian Cruger Coffin
Thomas M. Connelly
William D. Denney
Herbert S. Eleuterio
Linda Fisher
Crawford Greenewalt
Charles O. Holliday
Edward G. Jefferson
Ellen J. Kullman
James Lynah
James P. Mills
Hugh M. Morris
William Dale Phillips
John J. Raskob
Donald P. Ross
Franklin D. Roosevelt Jr.
Willard Saulsbury Jr.
Irving S. Shapiro
William H. Shaw
Alfred Sloan
Newton Steers

Businesses

Bellevue-Stratford Hotel
Central Coal and Iron Company
Chartline Capital Partners
Christiana Securities
Delaware Trust Company
E. I. du Pont de Nemours and Company
Fair Hill Training Center
Florida East Coast Railway
Florida National Bank
Foxcatcher Farm
General Motors
Hercules Powder Company
Hickory Tree Farm & Stable
Hotel McAlpin
Indian Motocycle Manufacturing Company
Nemours Trading Corporation
National Bank of Detroit
The News Journal
Philadelphia Phillies
Piasecki Helicopter Corporation 
Remington Arms Company
St. Joe Company
US Airways
United States Rubber Company
Victorine & Samuel Homsey
Wilmington Trust
yet2.com

Philanthropy & nonprofit organizations

Alfred I. duPont Testamentary Trust
American Liberty League
Camp Rodney (Boy Scouts of America)
Chichester Dupont Foundation
Delaware Museum of Natural History
DuPont-MIT Alliance
Jessie Ball duPont Fund
Kennett High School
Longwood Foundation
Long Wharf Theatre
Louisa d'Andelot Carpenter Park
Lynah Rink
Marion duPont Scott Equine Medical Center
National Trust for Historic Preservation
Nemours Foundation
New Bolton Center
Phi Kappa Sigma
Population Action International
Ruth Wales du Pont Sanctuary
Springfield Foundation, Inc.
St. Andrew's School
Team Foxcatcher
Thouron Scholars Program
Unidel Foundation 
U.S. Route 113
Welfare Foundation, Inc. 
Zip Code Wilmington

Buildings, estates and historic landmarks

Bellevue State Park (Delaware)
Brandywine Creek State Park
Delaware Park Racetrack
DuPont Building
DuPont-Guest Estate
DuPont Village Historic District
Epping Forest
Fairlee Manor Camp House
Hagley Museum and Library
Dupont historic sites along Delaware Rte. 141
Eleutherian Mills
Empire State Building
Gibraltar (Wilmington, Delaware)
Longwood Gardens
Louviers (Wilmington, Delaware)
Lower Louviers and Chicken Alley
Montpelier
Mt. Cuba Center
Nemours Mansion and Gardens
Stockton-Montmorency
Strand Millas and Rock Spring
Owl's Nest Country Place
Wilmington Trust Company Bank
Winterthur Museum, Garden and Library

References

Bibliography

External links

Dominick Dunne's "Maternal Instinct" - Lisa Dean, greatgrandaughter of Lammont du Pont - murder for hire

 
Business families of the United States
Episcopalian families
Huguenot families
Wealth in the United States